Michael Mitchell (born 25 November 1961) is an Indigenous former Australian rules footballer for the Claremont Football Club in the West Australian Football League (WAFL) and the Richmond Football Club in the VFL/AFL. 

Mitchell was originally from Carnarvon, Western Australia (WA).

Playing career

Claremont
Mitchell began his senior career with Claremont Football Club in the West Australian Football League. He won the Sandover Medal in 1984 before achieving All-Australian selection in 1985 and 1986.

Richmond
In May 1986 he signed a three–year contract with Richmond in the Victorian Football League beginning from the 1987 VFL season. He was regarded as one of the most exciting footballers in the VFL of the late 1980s and early 1990s, albeit during poor seasons for Richmond as a club. His play featured pace and a high leap. 

In 1990, Mitchell achieved both Mark of the Year and Goal of The Year awards in the same year, becoming only the second player in the history of the competition to do so.

A lightly built player, Mitchell was, however, known as a strong tackler and for his ability to chase down opponents.  His career was cut short by several head injuries and concussions sustained during his later playing years.

Retirement
At the end of his AFL career, Mitchell returned to Western Australia.

References

Bibliography
 Hogan P: The Tigers Of Old, Richmond FC, Melbourne 1996

1961 births
Living people
All-Australians (1953–1988)
Claremont Football Club players
Richmond Football Club players
Australian rules footballers from Western Australia
Western Australian State of Origin players
Indigenous Australian players of Australian rules football
Sandover Medal winners
People from Carnarvon, Western Australia
Australia international rules football team players